
Lac des Audannes is a lake in the Canton of Valais, Switzerland.

See also 
 List of mountain lakes of Switzerland

Audannes